In music, a monad is a single note or pitch. The Western chromatic scale, for example, is composed of twelve monads. Monads are contrasted to dyads, groups of two notes, triads, groups of three, and so on.

References 

Intervals (music)
Simultaneities (music)